Meyer Schapiro (23 September 1904 – 3 March 1996) was a Lithuanian-born American art historian known for developing new art historical methodologies that incorporated an interdisciplinary approach to the study of works of art. An expert on early Christian, Medieval, and Modern art, Schapiro explored art historical periods and movements with a keen eye towards the social, political, and the material construction of art works.

Credited with fundamentally changing the course of the art historical discipline, Schapiro's scholarly approach was dynamic and it engaged other scholars, philosophers, and artists. An active professor, lecturer, writer, and humanist, Schapiro maintained a long professional association with Columbia University in New York as a student, lecturer, and professor.

Background
Meir Schapiro was born in Šiauliai, Lithuania (then Governorate of Kaunas of the Russian Empire) on September 23, 1904.  His ancestors were Talmudic scholars.  His parents, Nathan Menachem Schapiro and Fanny Adelman Schapiro, were Lithuanian Jews.

In 1906, his father came to New York City and found a job as a Hebrew teacher at the Yitzcak Elchanan Yeshiva on the Lower East Side. Once secure, he sent for his family, who emigrated in 1907.  Schapiro's first name was changed from "Meir" to "Meyer."  He grew up in the Brownsville section of Brooklyn, where he was first exposed to art in evening classes taught by John Sloan at the Hebrew Educational Society.

He attended Public School 84 and then Boys High School in Brooklyn.  He attended lectures on anthropology and economics at the Young People's Socialist League.  During summers, he worked as a Western Union delivery boy, a warehouse packer, an electrical-supply assembler, and an adjustment clerk at Macy's.

Education
In 1920, Meyer Schapiro, age 16, entered Columbia University as both a Pulitzer and Regents scholar.  His professors included Mark Van Doren and Franz Boas.  Undergraduate classmates included Whittaker Chambers, Clifton Fadiman, Herbert Solow, Lionel Trilling, Henry Zolinsky, and Louis Zukofsky, with many of whom he contributed to The Morningside literary magazine.  In 1923, he traveled to Europe with Chambers and Zolinsky.  During his undergraduate days, he became known for his "Schapiric victory," by allegedly reducing an instructor to tears by means of dialectic logic.  In 1924, he received his bachelor's degree with honors in art history and philosophy.  
Princeton University denied him admission for his doctorate, so he continued at Columbia and earned his doctoral degree in art history in 1929.  His professors at that time included Ernest DeWald.  His dissertation, five years in the making, examined the cloister and portal of Moissac Abbey, built about A.D. 1100:    Dr. Schapiro's research went far beyond the implications of Moissac itself.  Medieval church history, liturgy, theology, social history, illuminated manuscripts, folklore, epigraphy, the analysis of ornament and national characteristics (real or imagined) all were pressed into service and synthesized.  As a result, what had been thought of as antiquarian artifacts were seen to have a completely different character.  "A new sphere of artistic creation," Dr. Schapiro called it, "without religious content and imbued with values of spontaneity, individual fantasy, delight in color and movement, and the expression of feelings that anticipate modern art.  This new art, on the margins of religious work, was accompanied by a conscious taste of the spectators for the beauty of workmanship, materials and artistic devices, apart from religious meanings."

(In 1975, he received his third degree from Columbia, an honorary doctor of letters.)

Career

Academics
Schapiro spent his entire working career at Columbia.  In 1928, he began teaching as a lecturer, before completing his dissertation.  In 1936, he became assistant professor.  In 1946, he became associate professor.  In 1952, he became a full professor.  In 1965, he was named University Professor.  He became University Professor Emeritus in 1973.  His final, weekly class at Columbia was "Theory and Methods of Investigation in Art."

He lectured at New York University (1932-1936), the New School for Social Research (1936-1952), Harvard University as the Charles Norton Lecturer (1966-1967), and Oxford University as Slade Professor of Art (1968). He was a visiting lecturer at the College de France in Paris in May 1974.

Society
Schapiro partook in the First American Artists' Congress Against War and Fascism in 1935, which produced a petition signed by more than 300 artists including co-founders Stuart Davis, Adolph Dehn, William Gropper, Hugo Gellert, Saul Schary, and Moses Soyer as well as fellow artists Milton Avery, Ilya Bolotowsky, Alexander Calder, Adolph Gottlieb, Jack Kufeld, Yasuo Kuniyoshi, J. B. Neumann, Isamu Noguchi, Ben Shahn, Raphael Soyer, James Johnson Sweeney, Max Weber, George Biddle, Paul Cadmus, Philip Evergood, Lorser Feitelson, and Lewis Mumford.  Schapiro and Gottlieb publicly resigned within the month when the congress failed to condemn the Soviet invasion of Finland.  Schapiro and other dissenters including Mark Rothko, Gottlieb, Harris, and Bolotowsky condemned dictatorships in Germany, Russia, Italy, Spain and Japan and founded a Cultural Committee which became the Federation of Modern Painters and Sculptors.

Schapiro was a proponent of modern art, and published books on Van Gogh and Cézanne and various essays on modern art. He was a founder of Dissent, along with Irving Howe and Michael Harrington. From 1966–1967 Schapiro was the Norton professor at Harvard University.

Schapiro's discourse on style is often considered his greatest contribution to the study of art history.  According to Schapiro, style refers to the formal qualities and visual characteristics of a piece of art. Schapiro demonstrated that style could be used not only as an identifier of a particular period but also as a diagnostic tool.  Style is indicative of the artist and the culture at large.  It reflects the economic and social circumstances in which an artist works and breathes and reveals underlying cultural assumptions and normative values. On the other hand, our own descriptions of form and style indicate our period, our concerns, and our biases; the way art historians of a particular age talk about style is also indicative of their cultural context.

Personal life and death

Schapiro's brother was financier Morris Schapiro.  His grand-nephew is artist Jacob Collins.

In 1931, Schapiro married pediatrician Lillian Milgram.  They had two children, Miriam Schapiro Grosof and Ernest Schapiro.

He died in 1996 in New York at the age of 91 in the Greenwich Village house where he had lived since 1933.

Impact

Artists
In the 1940s, when the Museum of Modern Art looked at purchasing Jackson Pollock's The She-Wolf (1943), Schapiro, as an acquisitions committee member, supported its acquisition.

In the 1950s, Schapiro urged Willem de Kooning to finish painting Woman I (1950-1952).

Marxist art history
Schapiro was, at points in his career, criticized for his approach to style because of its politically radical connotations.  Schapiro himself wrote scholarly articles for a variety of socialist publications and endeavored to apply a novel Marxist method to the study of art history. In his most famous essay on Medieval Spanish art, "From Mozarabic to Romanesque in Silos," Schapiro demonstrated how the concurrent existence of two historical styles in one monastery was indicative of economic upheaval and class conflict.

Students
Schapiro's students include:
 Sigmund Abeles
 Jonathan Crary
 Helen Frankenthaler
 Peter Golfinopoulos
 Michael Hafftka
 Allan Kaprow
 Hilton Kramer
 Robert Motherwell
 Dorothy Miner
 David Rosand
 William Rubin
 Lucas Samaras
 Virginia Wright

Portraits
Alice Neel painted his portrait in 1947 and 1983.  (Schapiro portrayed himself many times, including this young image.)

Awards

Schapiro was a fellow of the American Academy of Arts and Sciences, the National Institute of Arts and Letters, and the American Philosophical Society.

In 1973, Schapiro received an award by the Art Dealers Association of America.

In 1974, for Schapiro's 70th birthday, a dozen leading artists made original lithographs, etchings and silk-screens, sold in an edition of 100, whose proceeds endowed the Meyer Schapiro Professorship of Art History in art history and archeology at Columbia. The contributors were: Jasper Johns, Ellsworth Kelly, Alexander Liberman, Stanley William Hayter, Roy Lichtenstein, André Masson, Robert Motherwell, Claes Oldenburg, Robert Rauschenberg, Saul Steinberg, Frank Stella, and Andy Warhol.  The artworks were exhibited at the Metropolitan Museum of Art.
In 1975, Schapiro received the Alexander Hamilton Medal for distinguished service and accomplishment by the alumni of Columbia University.  The same year, he received an honorary doctor of letters degree from the university.

In 1976, he was elected a member of the National Institute of Arts and Letters.

In 1987, he was named a MacArthur Foundation fellow.
In 1995, his brother Morris donated $1 million to establish the Meyer Schapiro Professorship of Modern Art and Theory.

In 1995, he also received a special award for lifetime achievement from the College Art Association at its 83rd annual conference in San Antonio, Texas.  Schapiro had been a member since 1926:  he was cited for seven decades of scholarship and teaching in the field of art history.  "Meyer Schapiro, we honor you for 70 years of unique scholarship and perception, for showing us the way in which art history enhances our understanding of human accomplishment."

Bibliography

During the 1930s, Schapiro contributed to leftist publications including The Marxist Quarterly, The New Masses, The Partisan Review, and The Nation.

Books
 Vincent van Gogh. New York: Harry N. Abrams, 1950 and reprints.
 Paul Cézanne. New York: Harry N. Abrams, 1952 and reprints.
 The Parma Ildefonsus: A Romanesque Illuminated Manuscript from Cluny, and Related Works. New York: College Art Association of America, 1964.
 Words and Pictures. On the Literal and the Symbolic in the Illustration of a Text. Approaches to Semiotics series 11, ed. Thomas A Sebeok. The Hague and Paris: Mouton, 1973.
 Selected Papers I: Romanesque Art. New York: George Braziller, 1977.
Translations:
Italian, Romanica (Turin: Giulio Einaudi, 1982).
Spanish, Estudios sobre el Romanica (Madrid: Aliana Editorial, 1984).
German, Romanische Kunst Ausgewahlte Schriften (Cologne: Dumont Verlag, 1987). 	       	
 Selected Papers II: Modern Art: 19th and 20th Centuries. New York: George Braziller, 1978, 1982.
Translations:	
Swedish, Modern Konst-1800-talet och 1900-talet - Valda Studier, 1981
German, Moderne Kunst-19.und 20. Jahrhundert-Ausgewahlte Aufsatze (Cologne: DuMont Buchverlag, 1982).
Italian, L'Arte Moderna (Turin: Giulio Einaudi Editore, n.d.).
Spanish, El Arte Moderno (Madrid: Alianza Editorial, S.A., 1988).
 Selected Papers III: Late Antique, Early Christian, and Medieval Art. New York: George Braziller, 1979.
Translations:
Spanish, Estudios sobre el arte de la Antiguedad Tardia, el Cristianismo Primitivo y la Edad Media (Madrid: Aliana Editorial, 1987).
 Style, Artiste et Societe, trans. Blaise Allan et. a. Paris: Editions Gallimard, 1982.
 The Romanesque Sculpture of Moissac. New York: George Braziller, 1985.(Reprint of Schapiro's dissertation originally published in Art Bulletin. Includes photographs by David Finn)
 Selected Papers IV: Theory and Philosophy of Art: Style, Artist, and Society. George Brailler, 1994.
 Mondrian: On the Humanity of Abstract Painting. New York; George Braziller, 1995.
 Meyer Schapiro : the bibliography / compiled by Lillian Milgram Schapiro. New York : G. Braziller, 1995.
 Words, Script, and Pictures: The Semiotics of Visual Language. New York: George Braziller, 1996.
 Impressionism: Reflections and Perceptions. New York George Braziller, 1997.
 A kind of rapture / Robert Bergman ; introduction by Toni Morrison ; afterword by Meyer Schapiro. New York: Pantheon Books, 1998.
 Worldview in Painting—Art and Society: Selected Papers, Vol. 5. New York: George Braziller, 1999.
 The Unity of Picasso's Art. New York: George Braziller, 2000.
 Meyer Schapiro : his painting, drawing, and sculpture. New York : Harry N. Abrams, Publishers, 2000.
 Language of Forms: Lectures on Insular Manuscript Art. New York: Pierpont Morgan Library, 2005.
 Romanesque architectural sculpture: The Charles Eliot Norton lectures. Chicago: University of Chicago Press, 2006.
 Meyer Schapiro abroad : letters to Lillian and travel notebooks. Los Angeles, Calif. : Getty Research Institute, c2009.

Articles

Schapiro wrote some articles under assumed names.

 "The Nerve of Sidney Hook" (as "David Merian") Partisan Review (1943)

Critical studies and reviews of Schapiro's work
Romanesque architectural sculpture

Artworks
In 1987, Schapiro exhibited 65 drawings and paintings from 1919 to 1979 in the Wallach Art Gallery in Schermerhorn Hall at Columbia. Subjects ranged from portraiture, landscapes, family, war horrors, and abstraction.  Included were a self-portrait at age 16 and two portraits of friend Whittaker Chambers.

See also
Subjects and objects Schapiro wrote about at length include:
Castelseprio
Monastery of Santo Domingo de Silos
Joshua Roll
Ruthwell Cross
Moissac sculptures

Columbia classmates include:
 Whittaker Chambers
 Clifton Fadiman
 Herbert Solow
 Lionel Trilling
 Louis Zukofsky

Literature
C. Oliver O'Donnell: Meyer Schapiro's Critical Debates. Art Through a Modern American Mind, The Pennsylvania State University Press, University Park, Pennsylvania, 2019,

References

External links
On Archiving Schapiro: An informal forum that communicates and shares milestones during the course of processing the Meyer Schapiro Collection at Columbia University's Rare Book & Manuscript Library (RBML)
New York Times obituary
Jonathan D. Fineberg, "Meyer Schapiro," The Harvard Crimson, Feb. 6, 1967 (Page not found on 1-08-2021)
Schapiro article archive from The New York Review of Books
Columbia 250
Cindy Persinger, ‘Reconsidering Meyer Schapiro and the New Vienna School’ The Journal of Art Historiography Number 3 December 2010
Meyer Schapiro Papers at the Columbia University Rare Book and Manuscript Library, New York, NY

1904 births
1996 deaths
American people of Lithuanian-Jewish descent
American art historians
Columbia College (New York) alumni
Columbia University faculty
Harvard University people
The New School faculty
Lithuanian Jews
MacArthur Fellows
Marxist theorists
Jewish American writers
Jewish socialists
People from Šiauliai
20th-century American historians
American male non-fiction writers
Slade Professors of Fine Art (University of Oxford)
Fellows of the Medieval Academy of America
People from Brownsville, Brooklyn
Historians from New York (state)
20th-century American male writers
Emigrants from the Russian Empire to the United States